Dampier Bay is an Arctic waterway in Qikiqtaaluk Region, Nunavut, Canada. Located off northwestern Bathurst Island, the bay is on the west side of May Inlet.

Other bays in the area include Evans Bay, Purcell Bay, Stuart Bay, Shamrock Bay, and Half Moon Bay.

References

Bays of Qikiqtaaluk Region